is a song recorded by Japanese duo Yoasobi from their debut EP, The Book (2021). It was released on July 20, 2020, as a digital single, through Sony Music Entertainment Japan. The song was based on the Yoasobi Contest Vol. 1-winning novel of the same name written by Shinano. A middle tempo song, it depicts a couple breaking up in the morning. The song also accompanied the movie of the same name, Tabun, based on the same novel. The English version of the song, titled "Haven't" was included on the duo's first English-language EP E-Side, released on November 12, 2021.

Credits and personnel

Credits adapted from The Book liner notes.

 Ayase – songwriter, producer
 Ikura – vocals
 Rockwell – guitar
 Shinano – based story writer
 Takayuki Saitō – vocal recording
 Masahiko Fukui – mixing
 Saho Nanjō – music video animation, cover artwork design

Charts

Weekly charts

Year-end charts

Certifications

Release history

References

External links
 Tabun (novel) on Monogatary.com
 English translation of Probably

2020 singles
2020 songs
Japanese-language songs
Sony Music Entertainment Japan singles
Yoasobi songs